Prunus × pugetensis is a hybrid species of cherry discovered growing in the Pacific Northwest region of North America. It has been given the nominal common name Puget Sound cherry. It is a cross of introduced sweet cherry, Prunus avium, and native Oregon cherry, Prunus emarginata. Individuals have been found growing in British Columbia, Washington state and Oregon, in the natural range of P. emarginata. It differs from P. avium in a number of features, including having narrower leaves and smaller flowers carried on a peduncle. Conversely, it has broader leaves and larger flowers than P. emarginata. The chief difference from its parents is that its flowers almost always abort, and it rarely bears any fruit.

References

pugetensis
Hybrid prunus
Flora of British Columbia
Flora of Washington (state)
Flora of Oregon
Plants described in 2007
Interspecific plant hybrids
Flora without expected TNC conservation status